The Beth Israel School, a former school building located in downtown Portland, Oregon, is listed on the National Register of Historic Places.

See also
 Beth Israel Cemetery (Portland, Oregon)
 National Register of Historic Places listings in Southwest Portland, Oregon

References

Further reading

External links
 

1923 establishments in Oregon
Jews and Judaism in Portland, Oregon
National Register of Historic Places in Portland, Oregon
School buildings completed in 1923
School buildings on the National Register of Historic Places in Oregon
Southwest Portland, Oregon
Portland Historic Landmarks